Gregory's is the largest coffee and fast-food company in Greece with 371 stores in Greece, Cyprus, Germany and Romania. It is the 9th biggest coffee store chain in Europe and offers an enormous range of fine coffees and delicious food.

History 
Grigoris Georgatos opened the first Gregory's in 1972 in Athens, Greece.

From 1990 onwards, his son Vlassis Georgatos, gradually took over the business, with the strategic aim of expanding it through franchising.

In 2001, the company opened a store at the new Eleftherios Venizelos Airport in Athens, where it was the first ever Greek coffee shop brand that had a presence there.

By the end of 2002, the company had 100 stores, rising to 200 in 2005.

In 2006, the first five Gregory's stores were launched in Cyprus & Romania, bringing the total number of Gregory's stores in Europe to 250.

In 2015 the company opened its first store in Germany and in 2016 there were a total of 300 Gregory's stores in Europe.

In 2017 the company created its own e-order app, and in 2019 it widened its range of wellbeing products.

In 2022, with 370 stores in Greece and Abroad, the company revamped the design of its store, launching a new store image, highlighting its expertise in coffee & food and offering its customers an even better buying experience.

Stores 
Gregory's has more than 370 stores in 4 European countries (data 2022)

Organisation 
The company operates & expands exclusively with the method of franchise, in which it has almost 30 years of experience.

References 

Food and drink companies of Greece
Coffee companies of Greece
Fast-food restaurants